Sideroxylon tenax, called the tough bully, is a plant species native to Florida, Georgia, South Carolina and the southernmost part of North Carolina. It grows on dry, sandy soil in pine forests, pine-oak woodlands, and hummocks at elevations less than 100 m.

Sideroxylon tenax is a shrub or tree up to 8 m (almost 27 feet) tall. Stems are armed with thorns. Leaves are up to 7 cm (2.8 inches) long, upper side green and sometimes shiny, underside covered with a layer of brown hairs. Flowers are white, up to 5 mm (0.2 inches) across, borne in groups of up to 40 flowers. Berries are very dark purple, almost black, spherical to egg-shaped, about 10 mm (0.4 inches) across.

References

tenax
Plants described in 1767
Flora of the Southeastern United States